The 1996 Central Michigan Chippewas football team represented Central Michigan University in the Mid-American Conference (MAC) during the 1996 NCAA Division I-A football season.  In their third season under head coach Dick Flynn, the Chippewas compiled a 5–6 record (4–4 against MAC opponents), finished in fifth place in the MAC, and were outscored by their opponents, 353 to 351.  The team played its home games in Kelly/Shorts Stadium in Mount Pleasant, Michigan, with attendance of 100,074 in five home games.

The team's statistical leaders included quarterback Chad Darnell with 2,921 passing yards, tailback Silas Massey with 1,544 rushing yards, and flanker Reggie Allen with 1,229 receiving yards.  Darnell was selected as the team's most valuable player. Massey had three 200-yard rushing games, including 292 yards against Kent State, which was at the time the third highest single game total in school history.  Allen became the first Central Michigan player to total over 1,000 receiving yards, including a 229-yard game against Bowling Green.

Darnell, Massey, Allen, offensive tackle Scott Rehberg, and tight end Adam Simonson were selected as first-team All-MAC player.

Schedule

Roster

References

Central Michigan
Central Michigan Chippewas football seasons
Central Michigan Chippewas football